S44 may refer to:
 S44 (New York City bus) serving Staten Island
 S44 (St. Gallen S-Bahn), a railway service in Switzerland
 GER Class S44, a British steam locomotive
 , a submarine of the Indian Navy
 New Jersey Route 324, designated Route S44 until 1953
 Sulfur-44, an isotope of sulfur
 , a submarine of the United States Navy
 S44, a postcode district in Chesterfield, England